Lodovico Guicciardini (19 August 1521 – 22 March 1589) was an Italian writer and merchant from Florence who lived primarily in Antwerp from 1542 or earlier. He was the nephew of historian and diplomat Francesco Guicciardini.

Description of the Low Countries
His best-known work, the Descrittione di Lodovico Guicciardini patritio fiorentino di tutti i Paesi Bassi altrimenti detti Germania inferiore (1567, Description of the Low Countries), was an influential account of the history and the arts of the Low Countries, accompanied by city maps by various leading engravers.

Death
Guicciardini died in Antwerp in 1589; he was buried there in the Cathedral of Our Lady.

Gallery

References

Sources
 Guicciardini, Lodovico [Lodovico di Jacopo di Piero Guicciardini], Grove Art Online, Oxford University Press, [accessed November 22, 2007]]

External links

Online version of original 1567 copy, digitized by the Digital Library of the University of Bologna
Digital copies of maps from Descrittione di m. Lodouico Guicciardini patritio fiorentino, di tutti i Paesi Bassi, Antwerp: 1567. at the John Carter Brown Library
 Descrittione di Tutti i Paesi Bassi 1567
 Descrittione di Tutti i Paesi Bassi 1581
 Description de Touts les Pays Bas 1582
 Descripción de Todos los Países Bajos 1636
 Belgicae, sive Infererioris Germaniae Descriptio 1652

1521 births
1589 deaths
Writers from Florence
16th-century Italian historians
Writers from Antwerp
Italian expatriates in the Netherlands